Dávid Copko (born 3 July 1996) is a Slovak professional footballer who last played for Spartak Myjava as a midfielder.

Career

Spartak Myjava
Copko made his professional debut for Spartak Myjava against FC DAC 1904 Dunajská Streda on 7 May 2016.

References

External links
 Spartak Myjava official club profile
 Eurofotbal profile
  
 Futbalnet Profile

1996 births
Living people
Slovak footballers
Association football midfielders
Spartak Myjava players
Slovak Super Liga players